Miami Monthly is Southeast Florida's city/regional magazine, publishing news and information on the people, politics, life, culture and style of the greater Miami area.

History 
Miami Monthly evolved from a family of community publications founded in 1997 by publisher Elena V. Carpenter. Appearing first as tabloid-size newspapers, the Coconut Grove Times, Brickell Post and South Miami Times grew into glossy city magazines that were combined into an expanded city/regional in 2005.

Editorial content 
Each issue contains community news, people profiles, feature articles, real estate news and advice, fashion, auto reviews, social pages, a cultural and events calendar, restaurant reviews and listings, a wine column, and the Miami Moment photo essay page.

Miami Monthly is noted for its coverage of political issues, its analysis of real estate trends, and timely information of interest to the business community.

In July 2007, Miami Monthly broke the story of an organized group of City of Miami employees who participated in an underground business known as The Firm. "Robbing the City Blind" described how members of the Capital Improvements Department spent many hours each day working on their secret clients using city computers, vehicles and other equipment. A dozen initial arrests included charges ranging from organized racketeering to grand theft and fraud.

In November 2007, "Boom or Bust" exposed an enclave of single-family homes in a neighborhood-in-transition that were selling above listing prices, and promptly going into foreclosure. The feature story also brought to light an over-tasked law enforcement community unable to deal with the mounting cases of mortgage fraud in Miami-Dade County. A follow-up story in July 2008 documented thousands of mortgage-related foreclosures throughout the area.

Miami Monthly publishes three themed issues each year: A roster of the spring festival season (February), a focus on international real estate activity in Miami (April), and a guide to the local cultural season (October).

Readership and distribution 
Geared toward the area's professional population, Miami Monthly reaches readers from greater Miami's most affluent neighborhoods and communities.

Miami Monthly is the area's largest circulated magazine, with an audited print run of 50,900. It is distributed through direct mail, home delivery and strategic commercial, office, condominium and hotel drop locations.

See also
John Dufresne

References

External links
https://web.archive.org/web/20080816085910/http://www.miamimonthlymagazine.com/

Lifestyle magazines published in the United States
Monthly magazines published in the United States
Local interest magazines published in the United States
Magazines established in 2005
Mass media in Miami
Magazines published in Florida
2005 establishments in Florida